Majed Al-Khaibari (born 24 September 1991) is a Saudi Arabian footballer who plays for Al-Shoulla as a left back.

External links
 

Living people
1991 births
Saudi Arabian footballers
Association football defenders
Al-Ahli Saudi FC players
Najran SC players
Ittihad FC players
Ettifaq FC players
Al-Shoulla FC players
Al-Qadsiah FC players
Sportspeople from Jeddah
Saudi Professional League players
Saudi First Division League players